The 1980 Southwest Texas State Bobcats football team was an American football team that represented Southwest Texas State University (now known as Texas State University) during the 1980 NCAA Division II football season as a member of the Lone Star Conference (LSC). In their second year under head coach Jim Wacker, the team compiled an overall record of 8–3, with a mark of 6–1 in conference play, and finished as LSC champion.

Schedule

References

Southwest Texas State
Texas State Bobcats football seasons
Lone Star Conference football champion seasons
Southwest Texas State Bobcats football